Armadillo repeat-containing X-linked protein 1 is a protein that in humans is encoded by the ARMCX1 gene.

This gene encodes a member of the ALEX family of proteins and may play a role in tumor suppression. The encoded protein contains a potential N-terminal transmembrane domain and two Armadillo repeats. Other proteins containing the arm repeat are involved in development, maintenance of tissue integrity, and tumorigenesis. This gene is closely localized with other family members, including ALEX2 and ALEX3, on the X chromosome.

References

External links

Further reading